Maridi Arabic was a possible Arabic pidgin apparently spoken in the upper Nile valley around 1000 CE. If legitimate, it would be the oldest record of a pidgin. It is known from just fifty words in an 11th-century text.

In 1068, the Andalusian geographer Abū ʿUbayd al-Bakrī published the words of a traveler from Aswan, who had complained to the Caliph in Egypt that in the town of "Maridi", black Africans had "mutilated" the Arabic language. 

It appears that the text may be a caricature of an actual pidgin, or at least of partially acquired Arabic. It shares several features with Juba Arabic and Nubi Creole: a complete lack of inflection, including articles, possessive markers, and agreement; a single negative marker; ʔmny for the third-person dual pronoun, and perhaps the use of jaʿal 'make' rather than colloquial qaʿad 'stay' for the progressive. 

It is not known where "Maridi" was. It has been concluded that it was in Mauritania, with the single non-Arabic word in the text (below), kyk (people?), hypothesized to be from Songhai -koi 'people who' plus the Arabic plural -k. However, there are also indications that it was located in Upper Egypt or northern Sudan, as several of its features are found today only in that region. Specifically, Classical q has become ʿ (ʿayn), fwq "on" has become fwʾ, and j has become d. The last is a sound correspondence found today only in Upper Egypt.

Text
The only account of the language is the following text. 

One day there was a man whose name was Jumuʿa. 

He had a camel and a son.

They were going to stay in a place.

People(?) said to him, "Shame! You are a barbarian!

Your son should not walk, you barbarian, seat him!"

They were on the camel.

People(?) said to him, "Shame! You are a barbarian!"

The son sat and Jumuʿa walked.

People(?) said to him, "Shame! You are a barbarian!"

Jumuʿa said, "People(?) are neither good nor important."

See also
Varieties of Arabic
Juba Arabic
Nubi language

References

 
 
 

Arabic-based pidgins and creoles
Arabs in Egypt
Arabs in Sudan
Medieval languages
Languages attested from the 11th century